Player is the debut album from Los Angeles, California-based rock band Player, released on September 1, 1977 under RSO Records.

Reception

It was released in 1977 on RSO Records and featured the hit single, "Baby Come Back", which was written by guitarist/keyboardist/vocalist J.C. Crowley and guitarist/vocalist Peter Beckett.

"Baby Come Back" peaked at number one in the US and stayed on the charts for a total of 32 weeks. In the UK, it peaked at number 32 and remained on the chart for 7 weeks. The follow-up single, "This Time I'm in It for Love", reaching number 10 in the US, staying there for 17 weeks.

Track listing
"Come On Out" (Crowley) – 3:43
"Baby Come Back" (Beckett, Crowley) – 4:15
"Goodbye (That's All I Ever Heard)" (Crowley) – 3:44
"Melanie" (J. Crocker) – 3:39
"Every Which Way" (Beckett, Crowley) – 3:34
"This Time I'm in It for Love" (Larry Keith, Steve Pippin) – 4:20
"Love Is Where You Find It" (Crocker, Reed Kailing, Crowley) – 4:00
"Movin' Up" (Crocker, Kailing, Steve Kipner) – 2:50
"Cancellation" (Crocker, Kailing, Kipner) – 4:07
"Trying to Write a Hit Song" (R. L. Mahonin) – 4:36

Personnel

Player
Peter Beckett – guitars, lead (2, 4, 5, 8, 9), co-lead (6, 7) and backing vocals
J.C. Crowley – guitars, lead (1, 3), co-lead (2, 6, 7) and backing vocals, keyboards, synthesizers
Ronn Moss – bass, backing and lead (10) vocals
John Friesen – drums, percussion

Additional musicians
George Budd – sound effects
Gary Coleman – percussion
Wayne Cook – keyboards, synthesizers
Jim Horn – saxophone, flute
Reed Kailing – guitars
Jay Lewis – electric & steel guitars, sound effects
Maria Newman – string arrangements
Michael Omartian – synthesizers
Jack White – drums, percussion

Charts

Weekly charts

Year-end charts

References

External links
 Player-Player at Discogs

1977 debut albums
Player (band) albums
RSO Records albums